is a Japanese voice actor from Shizuoka Prefecture. He is affiliated with Ken Production.

Inaba is best known for his roles in Disney productions (as Dale), Buzz Lightyear of Star Command (as Buzz Lightyear), and The Transformers (as Cyclonus and Razorclaw). He also voiced as Gaogao-san the anthropomorphic Lion Scientist in the Shimajiro TV series and Shimajiro film series.

Filmography

Television animation
1979
 The Ultraman - Fisherman
 Kagaku Ninja-Tai Gatchaman F - Gyarakuta members
1980
 Nodoka Mori no Dobutsu Daisakusen - Adam
 Densetsu Kyojin Ideon - Rekuran
 Space Warrior Baldios - Morgan, Robot Soldiers
1981
 Ogon Senshi Gold Raitan - Futoshi "Bikku" Mizumi
 Voltron - Cobra
 Meiken Jolie - Barber, Pastor, General Store
1982
 Gyakuten Ippatsu-man - Sankano & Tome
 The Super Dimension Fortress Macross - Linn Shaochin, Maistroff, Oigul
 Ai no Senshi Rainbowman - Doctor Giruma
1983
 Mirai Keisatsu Urashiman - Joe
 Akū Daisakusen Srungle - Sazaar
 Armored Trooper Votoms - Mekitto
 Magical Angel Creamy Mami - Hiroshi, Shingo's Father
 Cat's Eye - Shunzo Kagawa
 Ginga Hyōryū Vifam - Mel's father
1984
 The Super Dimension Cavalry Southern Cross - Capt. George Lombar
 Ginga Patrol PJ - Pierre
 Yoroshiku Mechadock - Marukawa
1985
 Touch - Sakada
 Aoki Ryūsei SPT Layzner - Building, James, John
1986
 Uchūsen Sagittarius - Gamin President
 Mobile Suit Gundam ZZ - Dune, Magany
 Seishun Anime Zenshu - Takashima
 Machine Robo: Revenge of Cronos - Grujios, Dart, Guruzios
 Sangokushi II: Tenkakeru Hideotachi - Military commander
 Fight! Super Robot Lifeform Transformers - Cyclonus, Razorclaw/Predaking, Scattershot, Swerve
1987
 City Hunter - Sabou
 ESPer Mami - Yamada
 Machine Robo: The Running Battlehackers - Sorikondar, Rikimines
1988
 Tatakae!! Ramenman - Longwei, Miedeyama, Zhanma
 Sakigake!! Otoko Juku - J.J. George
 Mashin Eiyuden Wataru - Don Goro, Zan Kokku
 Oishinbo - Tamio Hidesawa
1989
 Bio Armor Ryger - Captain Katagiri
 Lupin III: Bye Bye Liberty Crisis - TV Announcer
 Miracle Giants Domu-kun - Motoshi Fujita
 Madō King Granzort - casino, Huge Whale, tulip
 Aoi Blink - Editor
 City Hunter 3 - Ambassador
 Yawara! A Fashionable Judo Girl - Coach Ishikura
 Magical Hat - CO2
1990
 Mashin Eiyuden Wataru 2 - Dotsuitaru Shougun, Marudaruma, Mutchirini
 Nadia: The Secret of Blue Water - Captain Neoatoran
 Edokko Boy: Gatten Taro - Hey-ji, Man A (episode 8), Pedestrian (episode 3)
1991
 The Brave Fighter of Sun Fighbird - Captain
 Future GPX Cyber Formula - Announcer
 Matchless Raijin-Oh - Satan Jr., Yakuza A (episode 5)
 Kikou Keisatsu Metal Jack - Chief Shirogazaki
 21 Emon - Yamada-Sensei
 Oniisama E... - Mathematics Teacher
1992
 Mama wa Shougaku Yonensei - Daisaku Yamaguchi
 Space Oz no Bouken - Aruherihito
 YuYu Hakusho - Iwamoto, Ogyoku
1993
 Wakakusa Monogatari Nan to Jou Sensei - Engineer
 Yūsha Tokkyū Might Gaine - Upper
 Kenyū Densetsu Yaiba - Miyoshi Seikai Nyudo
 Nintama Rantarō - Judayu Unazuki, Tobizou Katou
 Shimajiro - Gaogao-san (voice)
1994
 Mobile Fighter G Gundam - Jack in Dia
 Yamato Takeru - Baafs, King, Germain, Inaba, Coyotes
 Mahoujin Guru Guru - Kasegigorudo, Tatejiwa, Ukka XII, Agubyi
1995
 Magic Knight Rayearth - Innkeeper
 Ninku - Byakko
 Romeo and the Black Brothers - Rizzo
 Juu Senshi Garukiba - Mirage
 Mobile Suit Gundam Wing - Dr. J
 Soar High! Isami - Golden Tengu
 Dokkan! Robotendon - Garapon father, Doctor
1996
 Saint Tail - Fukuyama
 Rurouni Kenshin - Sakata, Tsukio
 Meiken Lassie - Henry
 Brave Command Dagwon - Desukoppu
 Midori no Makibao - Beard cyclone
 After War Gundam X - Rike Anto
 Akachan to Boku - Kindergarten Principal's Older Brother
 Chōja Reideen - Dorsal
1997
 Mach GoGoGo - Daisuke Hibiki
 The King of Braves GaoGaiGar - Producer
 In The Beginning - The Bible Stories - Ham
 Slayers Try - Firioneru = El-di = Seirun
 Chō Mashin Eiyūden Wataru - Kāmēn
 Fortune Quest L - Anri
1998
 Berserk - General White Tiger
 Gasaraki - Gen. Wayne
1999
 Chiisana Kyojin Microman - Chain Spider
 Jibaku-kun - Jiya
 Infinite Ryvius - Yoshikichi Shimomura
 Weekly Story Land - Teacher, Uncle, Salaryman
 Gozonji! Gekkō Kamen-kun - Valiance Alien
2000
 Inspector Fabre - Chief Valerie
 Brigadoon - Doctor
 Argento Soma - Director
 Clockwork Fighters Hiwou's War - Tadanari Iwase
2001
 Project ARMS - Stinger
 Gekito! Crush Gear Turbo - Ichidou Takekura
2002
 Seven of Seven - Handa
 Daigunder - Shuriman
 ATASHIn'CHI - Colleague
 Witch Hunter Robin - The Professor
 Ghost in the Shell: Stand Alone Complex - Maritime Self-Defense Forces Colonel
 Mobile Suit Gundam Seed - William Sutherland
 Barom One - Shiratori Kenichi
2003
 Tantei Gakuen Q - Hiromichi Kamihara
 Rumiko Takahashi Anthology - Doctor
 Mermaid Forest - Soukichi
 Gilgamesh - Doctor
2004
 Madlax - Senior Managing Director
 Monster - Former Secretary
 Gigantor - Chief Ohtsuka
 Kurau: Phantom Memory - Director Saito
 Beet the Vandel Buster - Mugain
 Black Jack - Tsubo-chan
 Yakitate!! Japan - Yulrich Rame
2005
 Kaiketsu Zorori - Wandokku Doctor, Witch
 Kotenkotenko - Dharma, Elder Bag
 Mobile Suit Gundam Seed Destiny - William Sutherland
2006
 Ayakashi - Takuetsu
 The Story of Saiunkoku - Seikintou leader
 Demashitaa! Powerpuff Girls Z - Silk Hat
 Project Blue Earth SOS - Tony Kimura
 Kemonozume -  Kyuutarou Ohba
 Souten no Ken - Tian Xuefang
 Code Geass: Lelouch of the Rebellion - Atsushi Sawazaki
 Bartender - Ryuuji Mineyama
2007
 The Story of Saiunkoku Second Series - Danna Dai
 Kaze no Stigma - Hyoue Kazamaki
 Mononoke - Sakae Kadowaki
 Shigurui: Death Frenzy - Mariko Hikobe
 Majin Tantei Nōgami Neuro - Kouji Umino
 Blue Drop - Hasegawa
 Rental Magica - Principal
 Elec-king The Animation - Sleepy Dad, Kaito, Director
2008
 Gegege no Kitarō - Guha, Hata-on-ryou, Hyakuma
 Our Home's Fox Deity - Minamoto-san
 Hakken Taiken Daisuki! Shimajirō - Gao-Gao
 Top Secret ~The Revelation~ - Soichi Enoki
 Slayers Revolution - Philionel El Di Seyruun
 Ryoko's Case File - Inspector Maruoka
2009
 Hajime no Ippo: New Challenger - Mr. Sakaguchi
 Shin Mazinger Shōgeki! Z-Hen - Count Brocken
 Cross Game - Coach Sentarō Maeno
 Sōten Kōro - Yan Zhong
 InuYasha: The Final Act - Master of Potions
2010
 Hime Chen! Otogi Chikku Idol Lilpri - Urashima
 Shimajirou Hesoka - Gaogao-san
 Stitch!: Zutto Saikō no Tomodachi - Tarou Nomimon
2011
 Gosick - Maurice
 Ghastly Prince Enma Burning Up - Shappoji
 Tamayura - Hitotose - Fū's grandfather
 One Piece - Neptune, Naguri
2012
 Aquarion Evol - Elco
2013
 Gundam Build Fighters - Chin'an Shishō
 Pocket Monsters: The Origin - Old Man Fuji
2014
 Shimajirō to Kujira no Uta - Gaogao-San (voice)
2015
 Shimajirō to Ōkina Ki - Gaogao-San (voice)
 Overlord - Khajiit Dale Badantel (episodes 5, 6, 8 & 9)
2016
 Shimajirō to Ehon no Kuni ni - Gaogao-san (voice)
 My Hero Academia - Dr. Tsubasa
 One Piece - Monjii
 Rin-ne - Kuroida (episode 35)
2017
 Shimajirō to Niji no Oashisu - Gaogao-San (voice)
2018
B: The Beginning - Boris Meier
Legend of the Galactic Heroes: Die Neue These - Emperor Friedrich IV
2019
 Shimajiro to Ururu no Heroland - Gaogao-san (voice)
2021
Shimajiro to Sora Tobufune - Gaogao-san (voice)
B: The Beginning Succession - Boris Meier
The Faraway Paladin - Bagley

Theatrical animation
 Ninja Hattori-kun + Paaman Chō-Nōryoku Wars (1984) - Man
 Grey: Digital Target (1986) - Mei
 The Venus Wars (1989) - Bartender
 Mobile Suit Gundam F91 (1991) - Boris
 Doraemon: Nobita's Fantastical Three Musketeers (1994) - Soldier Length
 Doraemon: Nobita's Genesis Diary (1995) - Yorimitsu Minamoto
 Eiga Nintama Rantarō (1996) - Tobizou
 Slayers Return (1996) - Elderly Sorcerer
 Well Gree Slayers (1997) - Old Man
 Daigekisen! Microman VS Saikyō Senshi Gorgon (1999) - Chain Spider
 Gundress (1999) - Ali Jaheeve Hassan
 Doraemon: Nobita and the Legend of the Sun King (2000) - Doctor
 Stuart Little (2000) - Race Announcer
 Detective Conan: Jolly Roger in the Deep Azure (2007) - Kamitaira
 Summer Days with Coo (2007) - Husband
 Tetsujin 28-go: Hakuchū no Zangetsu (2007) - Chief Ohtsuka
 Professor Layton and the Eternal Diva (2009) - Don Paolo
 Detective Conan: The Eleventh Striker (2012) - Koji Matsuzaki
 Dokidoki! PreCure the Movie: Mana's Getting Married!!? The Dress of Hope Tied to the Future! (2013) - Silver Clock
 Shimajiro and Fufu's Big Adventure (2013) - Gaogao-san
 Shimajiro and the Whale's Song (2014) - Gaogao-san
 Shimajiro and the Mother Tree (2015) - Gaogao-san
 Shimajiro in Bookland (2016) - Gaogao-san
 Shimajiro and the Rainbow Oasis (2017) - Gaogao-san
 Shimajiro the Movie: Adventures on Magic Island (2018) - Gaogao-san
 Shimajiro the Movie: Shimajiro and Ururu's Hero Island (2019) - Gaogao-san
 Qiaohu and the Fantastic Flying Ship (2019) - Gaogao-san (Japanese Dub)
 Shimajirō to Kirakira Ōkoku no Ōji-sama (2022) - Gaogao-san

OVAs
 The Samurai (1987) - Kagemaru Toki
 Kizuoibito (1988) - Colonel White
 Assemble Insert (1989) - Old Man, Prime Minister
 Mobile Suit Gundam 0083: Stardust Memory (1991) - Villy Gradoll

Video games
 Langrisser: Kōki no Matsuei (1993) - Albert
 Langrisser III (1996) - William, Christ, Gaieru, Glob, Ovu~a
 Langrisser V: The End of the Legend (1998) - Gaieru, Gorudori
 Ape Escape (1999) - Poppa
 Gunparade March (2000) - 
 Tetsujin 28-gō (2004) - Chief Ohtsuka
 Mobile Suit Gundam: The One Year War (2005) - Woody Malden
 Beet the Vandel Buster (2005) - Mugain
 The Sword of Etheria (2005) - Toto
 Soul Calibur III (2005) - Rock
 Kingdom Hearts II (2005) - Dale
 Professor Layton and the Curious Village (2007) - Don Paolo
 Kingdom Hearts Final Mix II (2007) - Dale
 Professor Layton and the Diabolical Box (2007) - Don Paolo
 Code Geass: Lelouch of the Rebellion: Lost Colors (2008) - Sawazaki
 Professor Layton and the Unwound Future (2008) - Don Paolo
 Kingdom Hearts Coded (2009) - Dale
 Tales of Vesperia (2009) - Boniface
 Kingdom Hearts Birth by Sleep (2010) - Dale
 Uncharted 3: Drake's Deception (2011) - Ramses
 Glass Heart Princess (2012) - Osamu Himeno Kado
 Kingdom Hearts HD 2.5 Remix (2014) - Dale (New and Archived Footage)
 Batman: Arkham Knight (2015) - Alfred Pennyworth

Tokusatsu
 Juukou B-Fighter (1995) - Mega Hercules (episodes 38 & 51)
 Choukou Senshi Changéríon (1996) - Deringer (episode 26)

Dubbing roles

Live-action
Armageddon (2002 Fuji TV edition) – Flight Director Clark (Chris Ellis)
Armored – Duncan Ashcroft (Fred Ward)
Asteroid – The President (Denis Arndt)
Bad Boys II – Alexei (Peter Stormare)
Batman Begins – Carmine Falcone (Tom Wilkinson)
The Benchwarmers – Mel Carmichael (Jon Lovitz)
The Big Lebowski (VHS/DVD edition) – Malibu Police Chief (Leon Russom)
Chain Reaction – Lyman Earl Collier (Brian Cox)
Chernobyl – Boris Shcherbina (Stellan Skarsgård)
Christmas with the Kranks – Vic Frohmeyer (Dan Aykroyd)
The Closer – Andy Flynn (Anthony Denison)
Cloud Atlas – Haskell Moore, Tadeusz Kesselring, Bill Smoke, Nurse Noakes, Boardman Mephi, Old Georgie (Hugo Weaving)
The Comebacks – Coach Lambeau Fields (David Koechner)
Con Air (2000 TV Asahi edition) – Earl "Swamp Thing" Williams (M. C. Gainey)
CSI: NY – Sid Hammerback (Robert Joy)
Daredevil – Leland Owlsley (Bob Gunton))
Die Hard with a Vengeance – Businessman, Felix Little
Die Hard with a Vengeance (1999 TV Asahi edition) – Dr. Fred Schiller (Stephen Pearlman)
Dog Eat Dog – Grecco the Greek (Paul Schrader)
Don Juan DeMarco – Dr. Paul Showalter (Bob Dishy)
The Double – Tom Highland (Martin Sheen)
Dragonworld – Brownie McGee (Jim Dunk)
Dudley Do-Right – Kumquat Chief (Alex Rocco)
Ed – Tommy Lasorda
Ed Wood – The Amazing Criswell (Jeffrey Jones)
Exorcist: The Beginning – Chuma
The Fast and the Furious – Tanner (Ted Levine)
Gandhi – Reginald Dyer (Edward Fox)
Genius – Albert Einstein (Geoffrey Rush)
The Goonies – Mr. Perkins
Gothika – Sheriff Ryan (John Carroll Lynch)
Henry's Crime – Max Saltzman (James Caan)
The Hobbit: An Unexpected Journey – Glóin (Peter Hambleton)
The Hobbit: The Desolation of Smaug – Glóin (Peter Hambleton)
Hoffa – Bobby Ciaro (Danny DeVito)
The Hunt for Red October – Senior Lieutenant Ivan Putin (Peter Firth)
I Love Trouble – The Thin Man (James Rebhorn)
Jacob's Ladder – Frank (Eriq La Salle)
Jennifer's Body – Mr. Wroblewski (J. K. Simmons)
Jingle All the Way – Mall Santa (Jim Belushi)
Julie & Julia – Paul Child (Stanley Tucci)
Last Action Hero (2001 TV Asahi edition) – John Practice (F. Murray Abraham)
Léon: The Professional (1997 VHS edition) – Fatman (Frank Senger), Receptionist (George Martin)
The Mask – Lt. Mitch Kellaway (Peter Riegert)
Mike and Dave Need Wedding Dates – Burt Stangle (Stephen Root)
Miracles – Ah Tong (Billy Lau)
Mission: Impossible 2 – Dr. Vladimir Nekhorvich (Rade Šerbedžija)
Pecker – Jimmy (Mark Joy)
Pitch Black (2014 Blu-ray and DVD editions) – Abu 'Imam' al-Walid (Keith David)
The Player – Tom Oakley (Richard E. Grant)
The Preacher's Wife – Joe Hamilton (Gregory Hines)
Red Eye – Joe Reisert (Brian Cox)
Shallow Grave – Detective Inspector McCall (Ken Stott)
Shaolin Soccer – Iron Shirt (Tin Kai-man)
Shazam! Fury of the Gods – Wolf Blitzer
Snake Eyes – Jimmy George (Michael Rispoli)
Star Trek: Deep Space Nine – Quark (Armin Shimerman)
The Terminator – Dr. Silberman (Earl Boen)
The Thing – Dr. Sander Halvorson (Ulrich Thomsen)
Today You Die – Agent Saunders (Nick Mancuso)
Unaccompanied Minors – Oliver Porter (Lewis Black)
Wall Street: Money Never Sleeps – Investor (Oliver Stone)

Animation
Disney productions – Dale
Animaniacs – Pesto
Bee Movie – Martin B. Benson
Buzz Lightyear of Star Command – Buzz Lightyear
Chicken Little – Principal Fetchit
Chip 'n Dale Rescue Rangers (second dub) – Dale
Dragon Storm – Theldag
Happy Feet – Nestor
Happy Feet Two – Nestor
Finding Nemo - Philip Sherman
The Lorax – Uncle Ubb
Over the Hedge – Vincent
Recess – Principal Prickly
The Simpsons – Ned Flanders, Moe Szyslak
The Simpsons Movie – Moe Szyslak (theater and DVD edition), Ned Flanders (DVD edition)
The Transformers – Cyclonus, Razorclaw, Scattershot, others
Treasure Planet – Doctor Delbert Doppler
Cars – Van, Jay Limo
Cars 2 – Van
Shrek series – Magic Mirror
Shrek Forever After – Pig #3

See also

References

Living people
Male voice actors from Shizuoka Prefecture
Japanese male voice actors
1951 births
20th-century Japanese male actors
21st-century Japanese male actors
Ken Production voice actors